Jorge Franco Alviz (born 29 October 1993), known as Burgui, is a Spanish professional footballer who plays as a left winger for Croatian club HNK Šibenik.

Club career

Real Madrid
Born in Burguillos del Cerro, Province of Badajoz, Extremadura, Burgui joined hometown club CD Burguillos' youth setup in 2003, aged 10. In 2010 he moved to CP Cacereño, and signed with CD Diocesano the following year.

After scoring 26 goals with the Juvenil squad, Burgui joined Real Madrid in March 2012, with the deal being made effective in June. He made his senior debut with the C team in the 2012–13 season, in Segunda División B.

Burgui first appeared with the reserves on 2 June 2013, coming on as a substitute for Juanfran in the 68th minute of a 4–0 home win against AD Alcorcón in the Segunda División. For the following campaign, he was definitely promoted to the B side.

On 21 September 2013, Burgui scored his first professional goal, but in a 1–2 home loss to Real Zaragoza. On 11 May of the following year he appeared on the bench with the first team, remaining unused in a 2–0 La Liga defeat at RC Celta de Vigo.

On 3 July 2015, Burgui was loaned to RCD Espanyol in a season-long deal. He made his debut in La Liga on 22 August, replacing Álvaro González in a 1–0 home victory over Getafe CF, and scored his first goal for the club on 15 December by equalising in a 2–1 defeat of Levante UD also at the Estadi Cornellà-El Prat, in the second leg of the last 32 of the Copa del Rey (3–2 aggregate).

Burgui's first league goal came on 27 February 2016, levelling again in a 4–2 win away to Sporting de Gijón. On 11 July, he was loaned to precisely that opponent for one year.

Alavés
On 11 July 2017, after suffering relegation, Burgui signed a permanent four-year contract with fellow top-tier club Deportivo Alavés. On 13 February 2020, he was loaned to Real Zaragoza of the second division until the end of the season.

Burgui was rarely played during his spell at Mendizorrotza Stadium, mainly due to an anterior cruciate ligament injury.

Šibenik
Burgui moved abroad for the first time in February 2022, joining HNK Šibenik of the Croatian Football League until June 2023.

Career statistics

Club

References

External links

1993 births
Living people
People from Zafra-Río Bodión
Sportspeople from the Province of Badajoz
Spanish footballers
Footballers from Extremadura
Association football wingers
La Liga players
Segunda División players
Segunda División B players
CD Diocesano players
Real Madrid C footballers
Real Madrid Castilla footballers
RCD Espanyol footballers
Sporting de Gijón players
Deportivo Alavés players
Real Zaragoza players
Croatian Football League players
HNK Šibenik players
Spanish expatriate footballers
Expatriate footballers in Croatia
Spanish expatriate sportspeople in Croatia